The Orange County Convention Center is a convention center located in Orlando, Florida. Opened in 1983 as the Orange County Convention and Civic Center, it is the primary public convention center for the Central Florida region and the second-largest convention center in the United States, after McCormick Place in Chicago. 

The OCCC offers  of space,  of which is exhibit space. The complex is located on the south end of International Drive, a major tourist area in Orlando.  

The original building (the "West Concourse") housed an 11,300-seat arena from 1983 to 1992. It hosted concerts by popular artists including Madonna, Tina Turner, Whitney Houston, Styx, Aerosmith, Mötley Crüe, and Hall and Oates. Its use declined after the Orlando Arena opened in 1989. The arena closed in 1992 and was renovated and converted into the main exhibition hall in 1996.

On April 18, 2012, the American Institute of Architects's Florida Chapter placed the building on its list of "Florida Architecture: 100 Years. 100 Places". 

Solar panels on the roof of the South Concourse provide 1 MW of power.

History
The Orange County Convention and Civic Center (OCCCC) was born out of a 1977 law passed by Florida's State Legislature. The law permit counties to collect a "Tourist Development Tax" on top of regular sales tax on hotel room stays, with the approval of the county's voters, for state-approved purposes.  In a special election in April 1978, the voters of Orange County approved a 2% Tourist Development Tax (the limit set by the state) to build a convention and civic center.  That August, the Orange County Board of County Commissioners (BCC) approved a location for the OCCCC in Orlando Central Park, on International Drive, and drew up plans for a  gross area facility. The following year, BCC and Orlando Central Park agreed to give OCP one cent per taxed dollar of the Tourist Development Tax (TDT) each year for 30 years; in return, OCP would donate land for the initial facility, give the county an option to buy another  for future expansion, and commit adjacent lands for hotel and tourist development.

Phase I was completed on February 25, 1983, at a cost of $54 million.  The Boston Pops Orchestra played at the grand opening on February 26, 1983, and 14,000 people attended the open house on February 27, 1983.

In June 1984, the BCC exercised its  option for $2 million and began planning Phase II. The TDT was raised to 3% by a state law in 1986, and groundbreaking occurred in February 1987 on Phase II.

That same month, an additional 1% was permitted for the TDT, increasing it to 4%. The BCC approved an additional three phases to the OCCCC (Phases IIA, III and IV), and improvements to the Citrus Bowl, its first non-Convention Center TDT project.

Phase IIA, completed in December 1990, added  more support space, used largely for office space and registration. The next month, planning for Phase III was begun.  By December 1992, "Civic" was dropped from the name, and the facility became the Orange County Convention Center.

Phase III was completed in January 1996, adding  of exhibition space, at a cost of $219.5 million. Phase IV followed that August at a cost of $198.7 million, adding another  of exhibition space and about  more meeting space. A retrofit of Phase I, completed in December 1997 at a cost of $32 million, opened up  more. By 1998, the OCCC had  of exhibition space over a total building space of over 4 million ft².

In June 1998, the BCC got a fifth cent approved for the TDT, partly for a grand Phase V, which would add a total of 3 million ft² of space to the OCCC. The Martinez Convention Center Commission, named after then-Orange County chairman Mel Martinez, was created to oversee planning and construction of Phase V.

Ground was broken on Phase V in August 2000 after a large convention organizer, Reed Exhibitions, agreed to move 42 conventions to Orlando into the new phase.  It opened one month ahead of schedule in September 2003.  Today, the first four phases are referred to as the "West Building", and Phase V is referred to as the "North/South Building", as it is divided into North and South Exhibition Halls which can be joined to form one large exhibition space or subdivided into six different halls (North A1, North A2, North B, South A1, South A2, South B). The North/South Building has  of exhibition space. Around the same time, the Oversight Pedestrian Bridge was built over International Drive connecting the two buildings.

In 2004, OCCC acted as a staging area for relief operations following Hurricane Charley, Frances and Jeanne.  Disruptions to convention operations were minimal, and a feared reduction of convention booking did not occur afterward.

In 2009, the Hilton Orlando, a 1400-room luxury hotel, opened. It adjoins with the South Concourse of the Orange County Convention Center's North/South Building via an elevated, covered pedestrian walkway. The Hyatt Regency, a 1641-room hotel, also connects directly to the Convention Center via the Oversight Pedestrian Bridge and the Hyatt Skywalk. The elevated walkway connects the North, South and West concourses over International Drive and the Hilton Orlando. Rosen Plaza and Rosen Centre, with 800 and 1,334 guest rooms respectively, straddle the West Concourse and also have elevated, covered pedestrian bridges connecting them both to the OCCC as part of Orange County's master plan to improve connectivity and safety for convention-goers.

In Spring 2019 plans were submitted for a 340,000 square foot expansion of the North/South Concourse.  In Spring 2020, the COVID-19 pandemic occurred and the expansion was cancelled citing shortfalls in tax collections necessary to fund the expansion.

Facility overview
The OCCC consists of two buildings joined together by a covered pedestrian bridge. The West Building, opening in four phases from February 27, 1983 (with an initial  of exhibition space) and 1996, is located on the south side of International Drive. The North/South Building, located on the north side of International Drive, was completed in 2003.

In its entirety, the OCCC includes:
  of exhibition space, including two  general assembly areas
 74 meeting rooms/235 breakouts
 The 2,643-seat Chapin Theater
 A 200-seat Lecture Hall
 The  Tangerine Ballroom
 The  multipurpose Valencia Room
 Three full-service restaurants/8 food courts
 Three business centers
 In-house electric, plumbing, rigging and technical services, plus wireless mobility throughout the complex
 On-site parking for 6,227
 Three covered loading docks/173 truck bays

Economic effect
The OCCC says it hosts events attracting about 1.5 million people annually, injecting $2.5 billion into the Central Florida economy.

See also
List of convention centers in the United States

External links

References

 HISTORY OF THE ORANGE COUNTY CONVENTION CENTER 1969-2005

Convention centers in Florida
Buildings and structures in Orlando, Florida
Tourist attractions in Orlando, Florida
Music venues in Orlando, Florida
1983 establishments in Florida
Music venues in Florida
Event venues established in 1983